Brian Craig Turang (born June 14, 1967) is an American former professional baseball outfielder, who played in parts of two seasons for the Seattle Mariners of Major League Baseball (MLB).

Career
Turang attended Millikan High School in Long Beach, California where he was third team All-CIF Southern Section as a catcher in 1985. 

Turang attended Loyola Marymount University, and in 1988 he played collegiate summer baseball with the Harwich Mariners of the Cape Cod Baseball League. He was selected by the Mariners in the 51st round of the 1989 MLB draft. He was the leadoff hitter the night of Alex Rodriguez's MLB debut. His only career home run was hit off of Jimmy Key at Yankee Stadium in 1994.

Personal
His son, Brice, was selected by the Milwaukee Brewers in the 2018 MLB draft.

References

External links

Baseball Cube

1967 births
Living people
American expatriate baseball players in Canada
Baseball players from Long Beach, California
Bellingham Mariners players
Calgary Cannons players
Harwich Mariners players
Jacksonville Suns players
Loyola Marymount Lions baseball players
Major League Baseball outfielders
San Bernardino Spirit players
Seattle Mariners players
Syracuse Chiefs players
Tacoma Rainiers players
Alaska Goldpanners of Fairbanks players
Millikan High School alumni